is a Prefectural Natural Park in central Ōita Prefecture, Japan. Established in 1951, the park spans the municipalities of Bungo-ōno, Ōita, Taketa, and Yufu. The park derives its name from the temple Jinkaku-ji and the Seri River.

See also
 National Parks of Japan

References

External links
  Maps of Jinkakuji Serikawa Prefectural Natural Park

Parks and gardens in Ōita Prefecture
Protected areas established in 1951
1951 establishments in Japan
Bungo-ōno, Ōita